Selayar may refer to:

 Selayar Islands
 Selayar Island
 Selayar language
 Selayar Islands Regency
 Selayar Island, Lingga Archipelago, Riau Islands Province, Indonesia